Ranguana Caye is a two-acre private island located roughly 20 miles west of Placencia. Those exploring the caye are required to set up transportation through private boat charters. The island includes a dock and moorings for visiting boats, located just off the Belize Barrier Reef. A day tour to the island is through Belize Ocean Club, a resort located in Maya Beach Village near Placencia and managed by Muy'Ono Properties. Snorkeling the Belize Barrier Reef and reef fishing are also some activities on the island.

History 
With the 17th-century origins of Belize being two different myths, it is said that Ranguana Caye formally called Cayo Renegado, was "the base of the 'renegade' Spaniard Diego el Mulato."

Nearby attractions 
 Placencia Mangroves 
 World's Narrowest Mainstreet 
 Savannah Forest Station at Paynes Creek
 Laughing Bird Caye
 Marie Sharp's Factory
 Bocawina Falls
 Gulisi Garifuna Museum
 Rosalie's Tortilla Factory
 Drums of Our Father's Monument

See also 

Geography of Belize
History of Belize

References 

Private islands of Belize
Islands of Belize
Populated places in Belize
Caribbean Sea